The mixed (or "open") ISSF 50 meter pistol was a shooting sports event held as part of the Shooting at the 1968 Summer Olympics programme. It was the twelfth appearance of the event, and the first where the competition was open to women (though none competed). The competition was held on 18 October 1968 at the shooting ranges in Mexico City. 69 shooters from 42 nations competed. Nations had been limited to two shooters each since the 1952 Games. The event was won by Grigory Kosykh of the Soviet Union in a shoot-off, the nation's second victory in the event (tying Finland for second-most all-time behind the United States' four). Heinz Mertel of West Germany took silver while Harald Vollmar of East Germany took bronze, with each nation earning a medal in their first competition separate from each other; they were the first medals for any German shooter in the free pistol since 1936.

Background

This was the 12th appearance of the ISSF 50 meter pistol event. The event was held at every Summer Olympics from 1896 to 1920 (except 1904, when no shooting events were held) and from 1936 to 2016; it was nominally open to women from 1968 to 1980, although very few women participated these years. A separate women's event would be introduced in 1984. 1896 and 1908 were the only Games in which the distance was not 50 metres; the former used 30 metres and the latter 50 yards.

Four of the top 10 shooters from the 1964 Games returned: two-time bronze medalist Yoshihisa Yoshikawa of Japan, sixth-place finisher Antonio Vita of Peru, seventh-place finisher Leif Larsson of Sweden, and ninth-place finisher An Jae-song of South Korea. Two-time reigning (1962 and 1966) world champion Vladimir Stolypin was on the Soviet Olympic team; runner-up Dencho Denev of Bulgaria and third-place finisher Hynek Hromada of Czechoslovakia also competed in Mexico City.

The Republic of China, Costa Rica, El Salvador, Israel, Trinidad and Tobago, Turkey, Uruguay, and Vietnam each made their debut in the event; East and West Germany competed separately for the first time. The United States made its 11th appearance, most of any nation, having missed only the 1900 event.

Markkanen used a TsKIB SOO MЦ55. The most popular pistol, used by over two thirds of the shooters, was the German Hämmerli. The Soviet weapon was used by 16% and the Austrian pistol by 6%. The American team used custom weapons designed by Franklin Green, who had competed in the event in 1964 but did not make the United States team in 1968.

Competition format

Each shooter fired 60 shots, in 6 series of 10 shots each, at a distance of 50 metres. The target was round, 50 centimetres in diameter, with 10 scoring rings. Scoring for each shot was up to 10 points, in increments of 1 point. The maximum score possible was 600 points. Any pistol was permitted. Shoot-offs were held to break ties for top ranks.

Records

Prior to this competition, the existing world and Olympic records were as follows.

Grigory Kosykh and Heinz Mertel broke the Olympic record, tying at 562 before a shoot-off.

Schedule

Results

References

Shooting at the 1968 Summer Olympics
Men's 1968